Paloma is the eighth studio album by Canadian rock musician Daniel Bélanger, released November 25, 2016 on Audiogram.

The album won the Prix Félix for Pop Album of the Year. and Bélanger won the award for Concert of the Year in 2017. The album won the Juno Award for Francophone Album of the Year at the Juno Awards of 2018.

Track listing
 "Ère de glace" (4:12)
 "Il y a tant à faire" (3:35)
 "Tout viendra s'effacer" (4:14)
 "Le fil" (3:42)
 "Perdre" (3:56)
 "Métamorphose" (3:04)
 "Un deux trois j'aurai tout oublié" (3:38)
 "Prédications" (2:14)
 "Paloma" (3:03)
 "Un" (4:05)

References

2016 albums
Daniel Bélanger albums
Audiogram (label) albums
Juno Award for Francophone Album of the Year albums